Molla Hamzeh (also Romanized as Mollā Ḩamzeh) is a village in Charuymaq-e Jonubegharbi Rural District, in the Central District of Charuymaq County, East Azerbaijan Province, Iran. At the 2006 census, its population was 38, in 8 families.

References 

Populated places in Charuymaq County